AMC Pankration (also known as AMC Kickboxing & Pankration)  is a mixed martial arts gym based in Kirkland, Washington. It is best known for producing UFC flyweight champion Demetrious Johnson as well as other high level fighters.

Overview 
Matt Hume started a Pankration club in 1988 while attending Central Washington University. That eventually became the basis for AMC Pankration which was officially named and formed in 1991.

AMC Pankration have also hosted MMA events in the past. From 1999 to 2008 it has held 9 events with 39 matches.

Notable fighters 
 Demetrious Johnson
 Josh Barnett
 Rich Franklin
 Bibiano Fernandes
Jens Pulver
 Jeff Monson
 Hayato Sakurai
 Chris Leben
 Matt Brown
 Tim Boetsch
 Dennis Hallman
 Caros Fodor
Bob Sapp

See also
List of Top Professional MMA Training Camps

References

External links 
 Official Website

Mixed martial arts training facilities
Kirkland, Washington